Urology, also known as The Gold Journal, is a monthly peer-reviewed medical journal covering urology and nephrology. It is published by Elsevier on behalf of the Société Internationale d'Urologie and the editor-in-chief is Eric A. Klein. It was established in 1973.

Abstracting and indexing
The journal is abstracted and indexed in Current Contents, EMBASE, MEDLINE, and Scopus. According to the Journal Citation Reports, Urology has a 2020 impact factor of 2.649.

References

External links

Société Internationale d'Urologie website

Publications established in 1973
Elsevier academic journals
Monthly journals
English-language journals
Urology journals